Edward Gerard Hettinger (October 14, 1902 - December 28, 1996) was a bishop of the Catholic Church in the United States. He served as auxiliary bishop of the Diocese of Columbus from 1942 to 1977.

Biography
Born in Lancaster, Ohio, Edward Hettinger was ordained a priest for the Diocese of Columbus on June 2, 1928.  On December 6, 1941 Pope Pius XII appointed him as the Titular Bishop of Teos and Auxiliary Bishop of Columbus.  He was consecrated a bishop by Bishop James Hartley on February 24, 1942. The principal co-consecrators were Bishop Francis Howard of Covington and Auxiliary Bishop George Rehring of Cincinnati.  He continued to serve as an auxiliary bishop until his resignation was accepted by Pope Paul VI on October 14, 1977.  He died on December 28, 1996, at the age of 94.  He is buried in St. Mary Cemetery in Lancaster.

References

1902 births
1996 deaths
People from Lancaster, Ohio
Roman Catholic Diocese of Columbus
20th-century American Roman Catholic titular bishops
Religious leaders from Ohio
Catholics from Ohio